Ahmadiyya is an Islamic religious movement in Liberia. Founded in the year 1956, during the era of the Second Caliphate, the movement today represents an estimated 10% of the country's Muslim population. Approximately, this corresponds to 85,000 Ahmadi Muslims in Liberia.

History

The earliest known record of an Ahmadiyya missionary in Liberia dates back to the 1950s, when Mufti Muhammad Sadiq, a missionary based in Sierra Leone at that time, visited Liberia in the spring of 1952.  Staying in the country for a period of one month, Sadiq took the opportunity to meet the President of Liberia, William Tubman and presented an English translation of the Quran as well as other Islamic literature. However, the Ahmadiyya movement was first established four later, by Muhammad Ishaq Sufi. As per instruction of Caliph Mirza Basheer-ud-Din Mahmood Ahmad, Sufi arrived in the capital Monrovia on 6 January 1956. A year later, on 12 June 1957, Sufi met with President Tubman as well, this time in his presidential palace.

Journeys by caliphs

As part of his tour of West Africa during the early period of his reign, the third caliph of the Ahmadiyya Muslim Community, Mirza Nasir Ahmad, visited Liberia. Invited by President Tubman, the caliph arrived at the Roberts International Airport, just outside the nation's capital, Monrovia, for a two-day visit on April 29, 1970. Accompanied by a special representative of the president,  Colonel Henri R. Gobson, and also a number of Governors, the caliph journeyed to the president's Executive Mansion and conferred in a private audience with the president. Later, the Ahmadiyya mission invited the caliph for a dinner, at the now defunct Ducor Hotel. The following day, he returned to a dinner at the Executive Mansion tendered by the president in his honor, during which the president described him as "one of the greatest leaders in Islam".  On May 1, 1970, the caliph left the country.

The fourth caliph, Mirza Tahir Ahmad, visited Liberia between January 31 and February 2 1988.

See also

Islam in Liberia

References

Liberia
Islam in Liberia
1956 establishments in Liberia